Walter Vera (29 March 1928 – 24 May 2018) was an Uruguayan sports shooter. He competed in the 50 metre pistol event at the 1968 Summer Olympics.

References

1928 births
2018 deaths
Uruguayan male sport shooters
Olympic shooters of Uruguay
Shooters at the 1968 Summer Olympics
People from Durazno
20th-century Uruguayan people